Presidential elections are due to be held in Algeria in 2024.

Electoral system
The President of Algeria is elected using the two-round system; if no candidate receives a majority of the vote in the first round, a second round will be held.

References

2024
2024 elections in Africa
2024 in Algeria